Wang Huiliang (born 5 June 1960) is a Chinese former association football player.

Playing career
Wang Huiliang joined Guangdong Youth academy in 1974 and was promoted to Guangdong's first team squad in 1980. He was called up to the China national team in 1985 for the 1986 FIFA World Cup qualification. On 12 May 1985, he made his international debut and scored a goal in a 6–0 victory over Macau. On 19 May 1985, he was the starting left midfielder in a 2–1 defeat against Hong Kong which was known as the 5.19 incident. Wang retired from football in 1987.

Personal life
Wang became a businessman after his retirement. His son, Wang Peng, is a footballer who currently plays for Guangzhou R&F.

References

1960 births
Living people
Chinese footballers
Footballers from Meizhou
China international footballers
Guangdong Winnerway F.C. players
Association football midfielders